Frank Wu may refer to:

 Frank Wu (artist), science fiction and fantasy artist
 Frank H. Wu, racial and legal scholar